Somerset Township is a township in Mercer County, in the U.S. state of Missouri.

Somerset Township was established in 1857, and named after an old variant name of the community of Cleopatra, Missouri.

References

Townships in Missouri
Townships in Mercer County, Missouri
1857 establishments in Missouri